Sergei Kotov (born April 6, 1985 in Odessa, Ukrainian SSR) is an Israeli former figure skater. He is the 2003 Israeli national champion. Kotov participated in three World Junior Championships, coming 24th in 2003 and his best result was 17th place in 2004. He also took a part in three European Championships (best result-23rd) and four senior World Championships (best result-26th).

Currently, Sergei is a physical therapist.

References

External links
 

1985 births
Living people
Sportspeople from Odesa
Israeli male single skaters